The Putney Magpies is an Australian rules football and netball club based in Putney and Fulham area of South East London, England. The club fields teams in each of the three AFL London divisions — Premiership (1sts), Conference (2nds)and Social (3rds). The associate Netball is called the Putney Blackbirds.

History
The London Gryphons were founded in 1999 by former West Coast Eagles, Brisbane Bears and Fitzroy Football Club player Mark Zanotti along with BARFL Admin Officer Donald Eastwood who originally played with the Earls Court Kangaroos, and have competed in the British Australian Rules Football League since that year.  The club was originally made up of former rugby players and were predominantly British.  After Zanotti's return to Australia after one year where the Gryphons made the finals, the Gryphons struggled both off-field and on-field, and eventually formed a partnership with the London Collingwood Supporters group, changing their name and colours to match those of the AFL's Collingwood Magpies.

The Putney Magpies were started in 2004 by Simon Thorp in his capacity as President of the London Collingwood Supporters Club, a phoenix rising from the ashes of the London Gryphons. Simon landed some good sponsorship, attracted some of the former Gryphons players (as well as some new blood), and with a bit of help from Eddie and the Collingwood Football Club, the Putney Magpies were born. Simon remained as President for the first two years.

The Putney Magpies Football Club made the 2004 Conference Grand Final in its first year as a club, a top four finish in 2005, developed five International players who represented their country in the 2005 British Bulldogs tour to Melbourne for the AFL International Cup, and boasted the 2005 Conference Best and Fairest winner and both the 2004 and 2005 Grand Final half time 'Dash for Cash' winners.

In seasons 2008 and 2010, the Putney Magpies competed in the London AFL Premiership Grand Final.

Putney now field three teams in the AFL London Competition with a side to suit all levels and abilities. The Premiership side must field 5 non-aussies and 4 British players on the field while the Conference side (known as the reserves) only has to field 2. The Social team is for anyone who wants to come down and try our great game for the first time.

The Premiership side is coached by former Richmond, Essendon and Collingwood player Mark Pitura who also played games for Sturt in the SANFL.

The Pies are now entering their 10th season in the AFL London competition and are now going from strength to strength in the number of participants involved in the club.

Training and Matches

The club trains at Hurlingham Park every Sunday at 1pm from the first weekend of Feb during the pre-season, then switches to Tuesdays and Thursday evenings from 6.30pm in South Park, Parsons Green after Easter once the daylight becomes longer.

Home games are played on Wimbledon Common at the Richardson Evans memorial playing fields in Putney Vale every Saturday during the summer months from early May until late July. Away games are played all through London. Finals are played in the month of August.

Honour board

COMMITTEE

PREMIERSHIP

CONFERENCE

International matches
2008 The Brussels Saints, Brussels, Belgium
2009 The Flying Dutchmen, Amsterdam, Netherlands
2010 The Flying Dutchmen, Amsterdam, Netherlands
2011 The Flying Dutchmen, Amsterdam, Netherlands
2012 Port Malmo Maulers, Malmo, Sweden
2013 Berlin Crocodiles, Berlin, Germany

Footy trips
 2007 Riga, Latvia 
 2008 Newcastle, England 
 2009 Newcastle, England 
 2010 Nottingham, England 
 2011 Lagos, Portugal 
 2012 Magaluf, Spain
 2013 Lagos, Portugal
 2014 Magaluf, Spain
 2015 Fulham, England
 2016 Sunny Beach, Bulgaria

See also

References

External links
Putney Magpies

Australian rules football clubs in England
Australian rules football teams in London
2004 establishments in England
Sports clubs established in 2004
Australian rules football clubs established in 2004